Tamy Ben-Tor (born 1975) is an Israeli visual artist.

Biography
Ben-Tor is one of a number of prominent female artists inventing characters and playing them herself, her work combines performance with photography and/or video.  Included in this lineage of artists are Claude Cahun, Eleanor Antin, Martha Wilson and Cindy Sherman.  Her themes draw on the social observation of daily life and gender roles, but dig with more risky commentary into issues relating to Jewishness and Israel, her country of origin where she graduated from the School of Visual Theatre.  Graduating then from Columbia University's MFA Program in 2006, she lives and works in New York and shows with Zach Feuer Gallery.

She has had solo shows at the Moderna Museet, Stockholm; Atlanta Contemporary Art Center; Kunsthalle Winterthur; and Cubitt Artists, London.  Ben-Tor has also participated in a large number of group exhibitions including; The Global Contemporary Art Worlds After 1989 at ZKM, Karlsruhe;Video Art: Replay, Part IIIInstitute of Contemporary Art, Philadelphia;Revolutions - Forms That Turn Biennale of Sydney; Manifesta 7; All About Humor Mori Art Museum, Tokyo; Combine Platter Museum of Contemporary Art, Los Angeles; ...but i was only acting! Museo Reina Sofía; as well as the PERFORMA 05 and PERFORMA 07 Biennials, New York.

Ben-Tor's work belongs to a generation of artists that use absurdity and humor to comment on serious ideas.  Underlying her outlandish caricatures and purposefully lowtech artifice of minimal make-up and settings, is a fusion of illusion and a stupid-smart whiplash arriving at unexpected views into the complexity of the human condition. At the same time, Ben-Tor believes herself to be ahistorical in her own thinking. When asked about feminism's role in her work at a 2006 conference on the very topic, she claimed that she "doesn't think about feminism at all." She said "It is problematic to associate myself with any ideology," and referred to feminist positions as "weak."

Press
She has been profiled and reviewed by a range of major news outlets including Art Forum, The New York Times, and The New Yorker. In one such article Ken Johnson of The New York Times describes Ben-Tor as the, "George Orwell of today's video art." The critic Roberta Smith has likened her work to the similarly shapeshifting works of Cindy Sherman.

Collections and awards
Tamy Ben-Tor has work in many public collections including The Pérez Art Museum Miami, The Tel Aviv Museum of Art, The Israel Museum, and The Whitney Museum of American Art.

She has won numerous awards for her work including the Foundation for Contemporary Art Grants to Artists award (2008), New York and Art Matters Foundation.

References

External links 
 Tamy Ben-Tor at the Zach Feuer Gallery

1975 births
Living people
21st-century Israeli women artists
Israeli contemporary artists
Columbia University School of the Arts alumni